Tirit, also known as trit, is a Turkish dish prepared by soaking broken-up stale bread in a broth prepared from offal, and then seasoned with ground pepper  and onion. Some variants add cheese or yogurt. 

Tirit is based on cooking techniques from Central Asia, where similar dishes were prepared using lamb and leftovers of various kinds, often including stale bread; see kuurdak.

Tirit is sometimes found in the cuisine of Mecca, where the story is told that the morale of a community hungry from famine brought about by a drought was boosted by being sustained by this dish until the return of times of greater plenty.

Khash is a similar offal-based dish eaten in many countries in Eastern Europe, Western Asia, and the southern Caucasus.

Similar combinations of offal and grain are found in haggis and some kinds of white pudding, which use oatmeal as the starch.

The forms of tirit involving cheese are similar to the barley-based Tibetan staple tsampa.

See also

 Tharid
 Popara
 Beshbarmak

References

Turkish cuisine
Saudi Arabian cuisine
Uzbek dishes
Şanlıurfa